The Archdiocese of St Andrews (originally the Diocese of St Andrews) was a territorial episcopal jurisdiction of the Catholic Church in early modern and medieval Scotland. It was the largest, most populous and wealthiest diocese of the medieval Scottish Catholic church, with territory in eastern Scotland stretching from Berwickshire and the Anglo-Scottish border to Aberdeenshire.

Although not an archdiocese until 1472, St Andrews was recognised as the chief see of the Scottish church from at least the 11th century. It came to be one of two archdioceses of the Scottish church, from the early 16th century having the bishoprics of Aberdeen, Brechin, Caithness, Dunblane, Dunkeld, Moray, Orkney and Ross as suffragans.

Origins
One Pictish king-list credits Óengus II, King of the Picts (died 834), as the founder of the monastery-church at St Andrews, but an obituary of a St Andrews' abbot is recorded in the Annals of Ulster for the year 747, around seven decades before this king ruled. The obituary of Túathalán, the abbot in question, constitutes the earliest literary evidence for St Andrews. It is possible that the church was founded during the reign of Óengus I, who had been ruling during this time.

Historian Jame Fraser points out that in England both Canterbury and York were dedicated to St Peter, with their junior bishoprics dedicated to St Andrew, that is, the churches of Hexham and Rochester. It is possible thus that St Andrews was established as a bishopric from the outset, junior to the bishopric of Rosemarkie, which appears originally to have been dedicated to St Peter. It is also possible that the emergence of the cult of St Andrew in the 8th century was connected with the appearance of "Constantine" as a royal name in the era, St Andrew being the patron of Constantinople.

Bishops of the Scots

The diocese's head, the Bishop of St Andrews, came to be regarded as the chief cleric of the kingdom of Scotland, ahead of the Bishop of Glasgow (2nd), the Bishop of Dunkeld (3rd) and the Bishop of Aberdeen (4th). The Augustinian account of the foundation of St Andrews, written between 1140 and 1153, notes and comments on a book-cover (cumdach) and the titles of the bishops:...[F]rom ancient times they have been called bishops of St Andrew, and in both ancient and modern writings they are found called "High Archbishops" or "High Bishops of the Scots". Which is why Fothad, a man of the greatest authority, caused to be written on the cover of a gospel book these lines:'Fothad, who is High Bishop of the Scots, made this cover for an ancestral gospel-book'.So now in the ordinary and common speech they are called Escop Alban, that is, "Bishops of Alba".

After the archbishopric of York received its first French archbishop, York was claiming the Scottish bishoprics beyond the River Forth to be its suffragans as part of the hierarchy of the Latin Church. Because Scotland, north of the Forth, had never been in the Roman Empire or part of Anglo-Saxon England, it was difficult for the church of York to produce any evidence of its claim, but it was established that Britannia had two archbishops in the Latin hierarchy. The time of Giric (fl. 1100), styled as Archbishop in Scottish sources, St Andrews is claimed to be an "apostolic see" and the "second Rome".

Eadmer, an Englishman from Canterbury was appointed to St Andrews by Alexander I in 1120, but was forced to resign the see soon after because Alexander I would not agree to make the bishopric part of the English church under Canterbury. Although possessing native Scottish bishops until the end of the 11th-century, with Fothad II or Cathróe being the last, the diocese was to have no Scottish-born bishops until the accession David de Bernham in 1239. Despite this, the Scottish see withstood York and Canterbury pressure, delivered through the Pope and the English king. Requests were made to the papacy for an archbishopric at St Andrews, and although these failed, the Scottish bishoprics were recognised as independent in 1192.

In 1472, Scotland seized Norðreyjar, which had been pledged by the King of Norway, in 1468, as security for the promise of a dowry which was never delivered. Accordingly, the diocese of Caithness was transferred from the Archdiocese of Niðaróss (Trondheim), in Norway, to oversight by St Andrews. At this juncture, St Andrews became a papally-recognized archbishopric.

Extent and possessions
Papal assessors in the late 13th century put the diocese's income at just over 8000 pounds, twice that recorded for the diocese of Glasgow. The diocese was the largest in the medieval Kingdom of Scotland territorially, stretching from Berwick-upon-Tweed to Nigg on the river Dee near Aberdeen.  Like many other Scottish dioceses, its territory was fragmented in parts. Detached parishes of the bishoprics of Aberdeen, Dunblane and Dunkeld cut up the diocese, while the diocese of Brechin lay entirely within its boundaries.

The bishops possessed a castle in St Andrews, and manors through their diocese fortified during the episcopate of William de Lamberton: Inchmurdo, Dairsie, Monimail, Torry, Kettins and Monymusk, all north of the Forth, and Stow of Wedale, Lasswade, and Liston in Lothian. There was also an important episcopal manor at Tyninghame near Dunbar.

When it became an archdiocese in 1472, the other 12 Scottish sees became its suffragans. In 1492, however, the diocese of Glasgow became an archbishopric too, taking Dunkeld, Dunblane, Argyll, and Galloway (as well as Glasgow) away from St Andrews. Within a few decades Dunkeld and Dunblane were back under St Andrews, though the bishopric of the Isles was transferred to Glasgow later.

Organisation
By 1300 232 parish churches are known for the diocese. It was divided into two territorial archdeaconries, both divided into provincial deaneries:

Archdeaconry of St Andrews

Deanery of Angus

Deanery of Fife

Deanery of Fothriff

Deanery of Gowrie

Deanery of Mearns

Archdeaconry of Lothian

Deanery of Haddington

Deanery of Linlithgow

Deanery of Merse

Office holders

Bishops and archbishops

Cathedral priors

Archdeacons

See also  
 Roman Catholic Archdiocese of St Andrews and Edinburgh
 Scottish Episcopal Church Diocese of St Andrews, Dunkeld and Dunblane

Notes

References

 
 
 
 
 

1689 disestablishments
St Andrews
Religion in Fife
St Andrews